Omar Raiba (born 17 July 1988) is an Italian slalom canoeist who competed at the international level from 2004 to 2015.

He won a bronze medal in the K1 team event at the 2011 ICF Canoe Slalom World Championships in Bratislava.

References

Living people
Italian male canoeists
1988 births
Medalists at the ICF Canoe Slalom World Championships